The Diocese of Cascadia is a founding diocese of the Anglican Church in North America (ACNA), created in June 2009. It encompasses 26 congregations. The name Cascadia was chosen because the Cascade Range is a prominent geographical feature of the region.

The diocese encompasses the states of Washington, Oregon, and Alaska. The state with most congregations is Washington, with 17, followed by Oregon, with 5, and Alaska, with one. The main church was St. Brendan's Anglican Church in Bellingham, Washington, until the move of St. Charles Anglican Church to Bremerton, Washington, which was consecrated as the diocesan cathedral on 2 March 2019.

History
The new diocese was formed by eight congregations, St. Barnabas (Shoreline), St. Paul's (Seattle), St. Brendan's (Bellingham), St. Charles (Poulsbo), St. Stephen's (Oak Harbor), St. Ursula's (Sultan), and  Trinity (Mt. Vernon), with a new church, Resurrection, being started at Fircrest, near Tacoma in Western Washington. The Diocese of Cascadia first Synod took place on March 7, 2009, in St. Barnabas Anglican Church. On the same occasion, Richard Boyce, a bishop of the Reformed Episcopal Church, was elected as their first Vicar General.

Bishop Boyce stated that "We are committing to unite as congregations whose dynamic worship and discipleship in the Word, in prayer and service nurtures faithful Christians who can reach out to others who are spiritually starving". Boyce noted that the formation of the new diocese will allow congregations to still retain membership with existing jurisdictions during this period. Fr. Kevin Bond Allen, rector of St. Brendan's, was elected president of the Diocesan Council. He stated that "We are not called to belong to a new organization or institution, but to be part of a great mission empowered by the Holy Spirit to make disciples of all people. Our clergy are now collegial pastors of our Lord Jesus Christ, who can pray for, care for and support one another in our ministry together. Our lay members can now share their ministries with our brothers and sisters throughout the Pacific Northwest and know they will always have a worship home away from home in their travels."

Kevin Allen was consecrated the first bishop of the Diocese of Cascadia by Robert Duncan (as archbishop of the ACNA) on September 30, 2011, in Seattle, Washington.

References

External links
Diocese of Cascadia (official website)

Dioceses of the Anglican Church in North America
Anglican dioceses established in the 21st century
Anglican realignment dioceses
Christianity in Washington (state)
Christianity in Oregon